Princess Martha Coast is that portion of the coast of Queen Maud Land lying between 05° E and the terminus of Stancomb-Wills Glacier, at 20° W. The entire coastline is bounded by ice shelves with ice cliffs  high.

Princess Martha Coast was the first portion of Antarctic mainland discovered by a human, Fabian von Bellingshausen and Mikhail Lazarev in 1820. The name "Crown Princess Martha Land" was originally applied by Capt. Hjalmar Riiser-Larsen to that section of the coast in the vicinity of Cape Norvegia which he discovered from the Norvegia and roughly charted from the air during February 1930.

On January 19, 1939, Nazi Germany reached the Martha Coast which was a part of the German Antarctic Expedition.

It is named in honour of Crown Princess Märtha of Norway.

Troll is located in the eastern part,  from the coast.  Explora Escarpment is an undersea escarpment off the coast.

Further reading

References 

Coasts of Queen Maud Land
Lazarev Sea
 
Regions of Queen Maud Land